Yadang Station is a railway station on the Gyeongui-Jungang Line of the Seoul Metropolitan Subway outside Seoul, South Korea.

Connections
G7426
567
600
80
075
076
081
083
084
084 (심야)
085  
086

Station Layout

External links

Seoul Metropolitan Subway stations
Railway stations opened in 2015
Metro stations in Paju